Victoria Park/Stampede station (named Stampede station until 1995) is CTrain light rail station in Beltline, Calgary, Alberta, Canada. Adjacent to the Stampede Park, the site of the Calgary Stampede, opened on May 25, 1981, as part of the original line.

The station is located on the exclusive LRT right of way, 1 km south of the City Hall interlocking beside Macleod Trail just north of 17 Avenue SE. A pedestrian bridge crosses Macleod Trail from the station towards Uptown 17th Avenue. The station has a centre-loading platform that is accessed by stairs and an escalator inside the station building. A ramp is located at the south end of the platform to provide wheelchair access.

Victoria Park/Stampede station is the only CTrain station with three platforms: the west track is used by trains going south, the central track by trains towards downtown and the Northwest, and the east track is mostly unused except for PR events, storage of LRVs or if one side of the main platform is not available. In the past, there was a special service train from the east platform to the northeast after concerts and Calgary Flames games, and during the Stampede, but this service is very rare.

As part of Calgary Transit's plan to operate four-car trains by the end of 2014, all three-car platforms were extended. Construction on a platform extension at Victoria Park/Stampede was completed in the fall of 2013.

Future Rebuild
In 2019 the city of Calgary unveiled plans to demolish the original aging 1981 station in favour of building a more accessible at-grade station to better integrate it with the BMO Centre expansion along with the extension of 17th Avenue into Stampede Park. The new station is budgeted at $83 million and will feature ground level access. Construction began on July 22, 2021, and is expected to be complete in 2023.

The station registered an average of 3,200 weekday boardings in 2005.

References

CTrain stations
Railway stations in Canada opened in 1981
1981 establishments in Alberta